The fifth season of the animated series WordGirl was originally broadcast on PBS in the United States from September 10, 2012 to June 14, 2013. This is the first season where May I Have a Word does not have new episodes. The fifth season contained 13 episodes (26 11-minute segments).

Cast
Dannah Phirman: Becky Botsford/Wordgirl, Claire McCallister, Chuck's Mom, Edith Von Hoosinghaus, Pretty Princess.

Chris Parnell: Narrator, Henchmen #1, Museum Security Guard, Exposition Guy.

James Adomian: Bob/Captain Huggy Face, Chip Von Dumor, Harry Kempel, Hal Hardbargain.

Jack D. Ferraiolo: The Butcher.

Fred Stoller: Chuck the Evil Sandwich Making Guy.

Cree Summer: Granny May.

Patton Oswalt: Theodore “Tobey” McCallister the Third, Robots.

Tom Kenny: Dr. Two-Brains, TJ Botsford, Warden Chalmers, Brent the Handsome Successful Everyone Loves Him Sandwich Making Guy.

Jeffrey Tambor: Mr. Big.

John C. McGinley: The Whammer.

Maria Bamford: Violet Heaslip, Sally Botsford, Leslie.

Grey DeLisle: Lady Redundant Woman, Ms. Question.

Pamela Adlon: Eileen aka The Birthday Girl.

Ryan Raddatz: Todd “Scoops” Ming, Tim Botsford.

Larry Murphy: The Amazing Rope Guy, African-American Cop, Anthony the News Reporter.

Jen Cohn: Female Bank Teller.

Ron Lynch: The Mayor.

H. Jon Benjamin: Reginald the Jewelry Store Clerk, Invisi-Bill.

Mike O’Connell: Grocery Store Manager, Big Left Hand Guy.

Episodes 
{| class="wikitable plainrowheaders" style="width:100%; margin:auto; background:#FFFFFF;"
|-
! scope=col style="background-color: #EE82EE; color:#000; text-align: center;" width=20|No. inseries
! scope=col style="background-color: #EE82EE; color:#000; text-align: center;" width=20|No. inseason
! scope=col style="background-color: #EE82EE; color:#000; text-align: center;"|Title
! scope=col style="background-color: #EE82EE; color:#000; text-align: center;"|Written by
! scope=col style="background-color: #EE82EE; color:#000; text-align: center;" width=30|Original airdate
! scope=col style="background-color: #EE82EE; color:#000; text-align: center;" width=20|Productioncode
|-

|}

References

2012 American television seasons
2013 American television seasons
WordGirl seasons